The 1949 Wichita Shockers football team was an American football team that represented Wichita University (now known as Wichita State University) as a member of the Missouri Valley Conference during the 1949 college football season. In its first season under head coach Jim Trimble, the team compiled a 3–6–1 record (2–3–1 against conference opponents), finished fourth out of seven teams in the MVC, and outscored opponents by a total of 212 to 211. The team played its home games at Veterans Field, now known as Cessna Stadium.

Schedule

References

Wichita
Wichita State Shockers football seasons
Wichita Shockers football